Alexandra Tóth (born 29 January 1991 in Zalaegerszeg) is a Hungarian football defender currently playing in the Hungarian First Division for Viktória FC, with whom she has also played the Champions League. She is a member of the Hungarian national team.

References

External links
 

1991 births
Living people
Hungarian women's footballers
Viktória FC-Szombathely players
People from Zalaegerszeg
Women's association football defenders
Hungary women's international footballers
Sportspeople from Zala County